A Garland for Linda is a tribute album for Linda McCartney, released in 2000 by the cancer-fighting organization the Garland Appeal. The album features classical music by ten contemporary composers including Paul McCartney, John Rutter and John Tavener, performed by the Joyful Company of Singers under conductor Peter Broadbent, recorded at All Saints Church, Tooting, London.

Track listing 
"Silence and Music" (Ralph Vaughan Williams) – 4:50
From A Garland for the Queen in 1953, the year of her coronation.
"Prayer for the Healing of the Sick" (John Tavener) – 8:53
Featuring John Tavener. From text by Mother Thekla and taken from the Russian Orthodox Service of Holy Unction.
"Water Lilies" (Judith Bingham) – 7:35
Featuring Judith Bingham. Written in March 1999, drawing on the composer's experience of swimming.
"Musica Dei Donum" (John Rutter) – 5:36
Featuring John Rutter. Taken from a solo chorus text from 1594.
"The Doorway of the Dawn" (David Matthews) – 4:53
Featuring David Matthews. Write about Linda's qualities & feelings.
"Nova" (Paul McCartney) – 6:28
Featuring Paul McCartney. Written from November 1998 to May 1999.
"I Dream'd" (Roxanna Panufnik) – 3:30
Featuring Roxanna Panufnik. Arrangement for a cappella chorus of a work.
"Farewell" (Michael Berkeley) – 3:30
Featuring Michael Berkeley. Taken from fragments of literary ideas from Milton, Shakespeare and Elizabeth Speller.
"The Flight of the Swan" (Giles Swayne) – 6:16
Featuring Giles Swayne. Inspired by the death of James Manson, son of a close friend, in 1996 from brain cancer.
"A Good-Night" (Richard Rodney Bennett) – 2:51
Featuring Richard Rodney Bennett. From a poem by Francis Quarles.

Personnel 
Paul McCartney: Composer.
Richard Rodney Bennett: Composer.
Michael Berkeley: Composer.
John Rutter: Composer.
John Tavener: Composer.
Ralph Vaughan Williams: Composer.
David Matthews: Concertmaster.
Roxanna Panufnik: Composer.
Philippa Davies: Flute.
Robert Cohen: Cello.
Choir:
The Joyful Company of Singers
Claire Hills: Soprano.
Katherine Willis: Soprano.
Henrietta Hillman: Alto.
Fiona Robinson: Alto.
Lorna Youngs: Alto
Paul Zimmerman: Tenor.
Alex Hayes: Tenor.
Michael King: Bass.
Greg Masters: Bass.
Chris E. Williams: Bass.
Peter Broadbent: Conductor.

References 

Garland for Linda, A
Tribute albums
Linda McCartney
EMI Records albums